General Cox may refer to:

Albert Lyman Cox (1883–1965), U.S. Army major general
Charles Frederick Cox (1863–1944), Australian Army major general
Edgar William Cox (1882–1918), British Army brigadier general
Jacob Dolson Cox (1828–1900), Union Army major general
John V. Cox (born 1930), U.S. Marine Corps major general
Lionel Howard Cox (1893–1949), British Army major general
Percy Cox (1864–1937), British Indian Army major general
Samuel D. Cox (born 1961), U.S. Air Force lieutenant general
Vaughan Cox (1860–1923), British Army general
William Ruffin Cox (1831/1832–1919), Confederate States Army brigadier general